Madubuko A. Robinson Diakité (born 17 December 1940) is a U.S.-born human rights lawyer and documentary filmmaker currently residing in Sweden. He has traveled widely throughout Africa and currently freelances as a guest lecturer and consultant on African migration, the African diaspora, human rights law, film history and mass media.

Early life 
Diakité was born in New York City 1940. Following his parents' divorce, his mother married a journalist from Nigeria, and he and his three siblings spent most of their teenage years there. Encouraged by his stepfather's important role in the struggle for independence from Britain, Diakité developed his own interests in journalism and human rights. Upon returning to New York City in the 1960s, he earned a law degree at La Salle Extension University in 1967.

Career 
Inspired by documentary filmmakers in New York at the time, he earned a diploma in documentary filmmaking at the New York Institute of Photography under George Wallach. He arrived in Sweden as a foreign student in 1968 and earned a Swedish B.A. (fil.kand) and an M.A. in film at the Department of Film Studies, Stockholm University (1972-3) under the guidance of Professor Rune Waldekranz, its founder. In 1973, Diakité won an Honorable Mention prize for a film on youth in Harlem at the Grenoble Festival of Short films (For Personal Reasons, co-produced with SVT2, Malmö). After completing studies for a Ph.D. in film history (ABD) at Stockholm University he published the draft of his dissertation as a book entitled A Piece of The Glory: A Survey of African American Filmmakers and Their Struggles with Popular American Myths in 1992.

After yet another stay in Nigeria, where he established the film unit at the Centre for Nigerian Cultural Studies, Ahmadu Bello University (Michael Crowder, Director).

In 1992, Diakité earned an LL.M. at the Faculty of Law, Lund University, and a Juris licentiat in 2007.
 
Diakité has published articles on film and human rights law for several international publications, and has headed several projects on the rights of people of African descent. He is also the publisher of The Lundian Magazine, an English language newsletter in Sweden, and is the director and CEO of The English International Association of Lund, an NGO based in Lund, Sweden (founded in 1987).

In 2008 he published Not Even in Your Dreams, a semi-autobiographical work studying child abuse in Africa.

Diakité is currently the Senior Researcher Emeritus at Raoul Wallenberg Institute in Lund, Sweden. His current research at the institute examines focuses on African diaspora issues. He has also researched human rights and migrant workers in Africa.

Personal life 
Diakité lives in Malmö with his Dutch wife. He is the father of Swedish rapper Jason "Timbuktu" Diakité.

References

Swedish people of African-American descent
20th-century Swedish lawyers
Living people
American emigrants to Sweden
1940 births